The 2016 edition of the Canadian Polaris Music Prize was presented on September 19, 2016 at The Carlu event theatre in Toronto, Ontario. The hosts of the gala were broadcasters Tom Power and Amanda Parris.

Shortlist

The ten-album shortlist was announced on July 14.

Longlist

The prize's preliminary 40-album longlist was announced on June 15 at the Yukon Transportation Museum in Whitehorse, Yukon. It includes the 10 shortlisted albums above, as well as the following 30.

In August 2016, for the first time in the history of the awards the Polaris committee released the full list of all 232 albums that had received at least one vote in the preliminary balloting.

Heritage Prize
Nominees for the Polaris Heritage Prize, a separate award to honour classic Canadian albums released before the creation of the Polaris Prize, were announced at the main Polaris gala. The shortlists for the Heritage Prize were increased to ten nominees, from five in 2015, and two winners were named: one selected by the jurors and one selected by an audience vote. The winners were announced on October 24.

1960–1975
 Public: Neil Young, After the Gold Rush
 Jury: Leonard Cohen, Songs of Leonard Cohen
The Band, Music from Big Pink
The Band, The Band
Robert Charlebois and Louise Forestier, Lindberg
Gordon Lightfoot, Lightfoot!
Joni Mitchell, Court and Spark
The Oscar Peterson Trio, Night Train
Jackie Shane, Jackie Shane Live
Neil Young, Everybody Knows This Is Nowhere

1976–1985
 Public: Rush, Moving Pictures
 Jury: Kate & Anna McGarrigle, Kate & Anna McGarrigle
Bruce Cockburn, Stealing Fire
D.O.A., Hardcore '81
Fifth Column, To Sir With Hate
Glenn Gould, Bach: The Goldberg Variations
Martha and the Muffins, This Is the Ice Age
Jackie Mittoo, Showcase Volume 3
Rough Trade, Avoid Freud
Leroy Sibbles, On Top

1986–1995
 Public: Blue Rodeo, Five Days in July
 Jury: Mary Margaret O'Hara, Miss America
Dream Warriors, And Now the Legacy Begins
Maestro Fresh Wes, Symphony in Effect
Daniel Lanois, Acadie
Sarah McLachlan, Fumbling Towards Ecstasy
Main Source, Breaking Atoms
Alanis Morissette, Jagged Little Pill
John Oswald, Plunderphonics
The Tragically Hip, Fully Completely

1996–2005
 Public: Arcade Fire, Funeral
 Jury: Lhasa de Sela, La Llorona
Bran Van 3000, Glee
Broken Social Scene, You Forgot It in People
Constantines, Shine a Light
The Dears, No Cities Left
Destroyer, Streethawk: A Seduction
Esthero, Breath from Another
Feist, Let It Die
k-os, Joyful Rebellion

References

External links
 Polaris Music Prize

2016 in Canadian music
2016 music awards
2016